Ron Warren (born 5 October 1928) is a former  Australian rules footballer who played with Geelong in the Victorian Football League (VFL).

Notes

External links 

Living people
1928 births
Australian rules footballers from Victoria (Australia)
Geelong Football Club players